Summertime is an Italian drama streaming television series produced by Cattleya that premiered on Netflix on 29 April 2020. The series stars Rebecca Coco Edogamhe, Ludovico Tersigni, and Amanda Campana. It takes place at a small town on the Adriatic coast, Cesenatico, and revolves around Summer (Rebecca Coco Edogamhe) and her love life. It is inspired by Three Meters Above the Sky by Federico Moccia. After the premiere of the first season, Netflix renewed the series for a second season. In 2021, Netflix reported that Summertime was renewed for a third and final season.

Plot
In the town of Cesenatico, Summer and Ale are two people with opposite lifestyles. Summer is a very introverted young woman; she hates the summer and decides to find a job at The Grand Hotel Cesenatico to financially support her mother as her jazz musician father has left for the summer to work abroad. Summer has two best friends, Sofia and Edo, and a younger sister named Blue. Ale is a young man originally from Rome who is a famous motorcyclist. He has taken a break from competing with his racing team for the summer after a dangerous racing accident nearly kills him. His father is his greatest supporter and wants him to go back to racing once the summer is over; however, Ale has lost his interest in racing. Ale's mother, Laura, is the manager of the hotel where Summer works. Ale falls in love with Summer and tries to woo her.

Cast
 Coco Rebecca Edogamhe as Summer Bennati
 Ludovico Tersigni as Alessandro "Ale" Alba
 Amanda Campana as Sofia
 Andrea Lattanzi as Dario
 Giovanni Maini as Edo
 Thony as Isabella
 Alice Ann Edogamhe as Blue Bennati
 Stefano Fregni as Piero
 Giuseppe Giacobazzi as Loris
 Eugenio Krauss as Bruno De Cara
 Maria Sole Mansutti as Laura Alba
 Mario Sgueglia as Maurizio Alba
 Caterina Biasiol as Maddalena
 Alberto Boubakar Malanchino as Antony Bennati

Episodes

Series overview

Season 1 (2020)

Season 2 (2021)

Production

Casting
Over 2,000 people attended the casting calls in Cesena, Cesenatico, Ravenna, and Rimini. The full cast had consisted of first-time actors, with the exception of Ludovico Tersigni.

Filming
The filming of the series began in Marina di Ravenna, moved to Cesenatico, and ended in Rome. Filming from the first season was finished on 5 September 2019.

The series, produced by Cattleya, was inspired by Three Meters Above The Sky by Federico Moccia.

Release
The first trailer was released on 8 April 2020 in Italian. The English trailer was released a week later on 15 April. The full first season of Summertime was released on 29 April 2020 on Netflix.

Reception

References

External links
 
 

2020s Italian drama television series
2020 Italian television series debuts
Italian-language Netflix original programming